Luman is both a surname and a given name. Notable people with the name include:

Given name
 Luman Aldrich (1852–1916), American football player and coach
 Luman L. Cadwell (1836–1925), American Civil War lieutenant awarded the Medal of Honor
 Luman Reed (1787–1836), American merchant and an important patron of the arts
 Luman Walters (c. 1789–1860), known for his connection with the family of Joseph Smith, Jr., the founder of the Latter Day Saint movement
 Luman Watson (1790–1834), American clockmaker
 Luman Hamlin Weller (1833–1914), United States Greenback Party member

Surname
 Bob Luman (1937–1978), American country and rockabilly singer
 Richard Luman (1900–1973), American football and basketball player

Fictionals
Luman, a character from  anime

English-language masculine given names